Harry Knapp may refer to:

 Harry Shepard Knapp (1856–1928), Vice Admiral of the United States Navy
 Harry K. Knapp (1865–1926), United States financier and horse racing executive

See also
 USS Knapp (DD-653), ship named for Harry Shepard Knapp
 Harold A. Knapp (1924–1989), American mathematician